Dalur is a village in the Faroe Islands. Dalur is located on the east-side of Sandoy.
The village lies in the bottom of a relatively large valley. Dalur means valley in Faroese.

A little road leads from Dalur to the south-tip of the island. From there it is possible to walk to the bird cliffs Skorin.
The church in Dalur was built in 1957 and this is the only church that has ever been here.

Gallery

See also
 List of towns in the Faroe Islands

References

External links

Faroeislands.dk: Dalur Images and description of all cities on the Faroe Islands.

Populated places in the Faroe Islands
Valleys of the Faroe Islands
Sandoy